The Betawi mask dance is a theatrical form of dance and drama of Betawi people in Jakarta, Indonesia. This dance-drama encompasses dance, music, bebodoran (comedy) and lakon (drama). The Betawi mask dance demonstrates the theme of Betawi society life which represented in the form of dance and drama. It is called mask dance because the dancers using topeng (mask) during dancing which Betawi people believed that the topeng has magical powers.

History and origin
The Betawi mask dance was first created by Mak Kinang and Kong Djioen in 1930 which was inspired by Cirebonese mask dance. This theatrical form of dance drama developed in the area of the Betawi Pinggir community (Betawi Ora) in Jakarta.

Social functions
The Betawi mask dance has some social functions in Betawi society. In the past, Betawi people believed that Betawi mask dance has function to keep them away from dangers, diseases and calamities. However, nowadays, Betawi occasions often performed the Betawi mask dance as a part of the occasion, such as in Betawi weddings, circumcisions and Lebaran.

Musical instruments
In the Betawi mask dance performance, musical instruments that usually played, includes rebab, gong, kendang, kempul, kulanter and kecrek.

See also

Dance in Indonesia
Cirebonese mask dance
Topeng dance

References

External links
Tari Topeng Betawi of Jakarta - Gema Citra Nusantara @ Llangollen International Eisteddfod 2016 (YouTube)
Betawi Dance at SCBD Jakarta (YouTube)

Dances of Java
Theatre in Indonesia
Traditional drama and theatre of Indonesia
Masked dances
Masquerade ceremonies in Asia